Comedy Connections is a BBC One documentary series produced by BBC Scotland that aired from 2003 to 2008. The show looked at the stories behind the production of some of Britain's comedy television programmes, showing how they tied in with the production of other comedy shows (hence "connections"). The show featured interviews with some of the cast and crew of the subject programme, as well as footage from the series.

Comedy Connections mostly documented BBC comedies and sitcoms, although two programmes have been from ITV (three counting Men Behaving Badly which moved from ITV to the BBC after two series) and two from Channel 4.

The first series consists of six episodes while the rest of the series consist of eight episodes each. The first two series were narrated by Julia Sawalha and the rest of the series by Doon Mackichan.

Series summary

Episodes
The first two series were narrated by Julia Sawalha and the third series onwards by Doon Mackichan.

Series 1 (2003)

Series 2 (2004)

Series 3 (2005)

Series 4 (2006)

Series 5 (2007)

Series 6 (2008)

Special

Spin-offs based on other TV generations
In 2005, the BBC broadcast Drama Connections, which used the same format, looked at the history of popular British television dramas. However, only one series was made and shown.

In 2007, the BBC broadcast Movie Connections, focusing on popular British films. A second series was broadcast in early 2009.

In 2010, ITV aired a similar programme called "Drama Trails", narrated by James Nesbitt.

Other show based on the Comedy Connections format
In 2008, ITV launched their own documentary series under the title Comedy Classics mostly documenting ITV's sitcoms and comedies.

Series 1 (2008)
On the Buses (9 September 2008)
Rising Damp  (23 September 2008)
Doctor in the House (7 October 2008)
Brass (14 October 2008)
Duty Free (18 November 2008)
The New Statesman (2 December 2008)

External links

2003 British television series debuts
2008 British television series endings
2000s British comedy television series
2000s British documentary television series
BBC Scotland television shows
BBC television documentaries
Television series about television
English-language television shows